In the Eye of the Storm may refer to:

 In the Eye of the Storm (Outlaws album), by American southern rock band Outlaws, 1979
 In the Eye of the Storm (Roger Hodgson album), the first solo album by former Supertramp member Roger Hodgson
 In the Eye of the Storm, a memoir by John Groberg
 In the Eye of the Storm, a memoir by Kurt Waldheim
 In the Eye of the Storm: The Life of General H. Norman Schwarzkopf, by  Claudio Gatti and Roger Cohen

See also
 Eye of the Storm (disambiguation)
 Into the Eye of the Storm, a 1996 album by Artension